(born August 14, 1980) is a Japanese mixed martial artist and professional wrestler, who fights in the heavyweight division. He is the former DEEP Megaton Champion, and has also fought in DREAM, M-1 Global and KSW.

Judo
Yusuke Kawaguchi came in third place at the high school-level national Judo championships and third place at the 1999 University Judo Championships in the 100 kg weight class.

Mixed martial arts

DEEP
Kawaguchi made his mixed martial arts debut on April 13, 2007, at DEEP: 29th Impact and defeated his opponent Hirotaka Fujiyama by majority decision. He went on to win his next two fights by way of knockout in the first round and in 2008, he took part in the DEEP Megaton Grand Prix. He TKO'd Nobuyoshi Takahara in the preliminary round and advanced to the quarter-finals where he faced former sumo wrestler Wakashoyo. Wakashoyo rushed Kawaguchi at the beginning of the fight and was knocked out after just 16 seconds. Kawaguchi then advanced to the final stage, where the semi-finals and final were held in one night. In the semis, he came up against Shunji Kosaka, and beat him after his corner threw in the towel within 45 seconds of the first round. Shunsuke Inoue was then to be his opponent in the final. After two four-minute rounds, Kawaguchi emerged the victor by way of split decision to become the DEEP Megaton Champion.

On October 23, 2008, Kawaguchi defended his title against Mongolian challenger Baru Harn aka Seryu at DEEP: 38th Impact. He blitzed Seryu with machinegun punches in the first round of the fight but could not finish him. With both men gassed by the second period, the fight quickly devolved into moments of sloppy punching and leaning on each other in the clinch. A majority decision for Kawaguchi resulted after two judges ruled in his favor, with one judge ruling it a draw.

Seigo Mizuguchi, who Kawaguchi already beat in 2007, then challenged him at DEEP: 44th Impact on October 10, 2009. Kawaguchi opened the bout with an initial barrage of machine gun punches, dropping Mizuguchi in a corner. Mizuguchi recovered, however, tossed the champ over his hip in the harai-goshi and landed in side control, where he squeezed Kawaguchi's head with a neck crank. Kawaguchi escaped and, as the visibly fitter of the two, proceeded to string together big punches for the rest of the bout. Gassed but still tough, Mizuguchi ate all of Kawaguchi's punches while throwing winging singles of his own. Though his face was red and swollen, Mizuguchi would not go down, prompting Kawaguchi to switch tactics midway through the bout, as he chopped him down with kicks. When Mizuguchi limped into a corner at the 1:27 mark of the third round, cornerman Kazuhiro Nakamura threw in the towel. Referee Yoshinori Umeki did not see the towel but stopped the bout soon after.

Another challenger then stepped up, this time in the form of Guam'sRoque Martinez. He, too, was unable to defeat Kawaguchi who won by unanimous decision after three rounds.

M-1 Challenge
In 2009, he represented Team Japan in the M-1 Challenge. His first fight came against England's Rob Broughton on April 29, where he recorded the first loss of his career. Every time Kawaguchi stepped in to engage, Broughton's left hook was there to meet him, and every time Kawaguchi tried to retreat, Broughton's sharp left jab was there to chase him. Broughton also controlled Kawaguchi on the mat, as he shut him down in both rounds and won via unanimous decision.

Kawaguchi's second fight representing Japan was on April 16 in the Netherlands. He took on Cirio Tejera of Spain and won by unanimous decision after two rounds.

KSW
On May 7, 2010, Kawaguchi faced 5-time World's Strongest Man Mariusz Pudzianowski at KSW XIII: Kumite in Katowice, Poland. Pudzianowski rushed Kawaguchi at the opening bell and took him down with a lateral drop, but Kawaguchi proved tougher than anticipated. A quickly gassing Pudzianowski had to dig deep to keep control of the fight after he failed to finish with the opening salvo. Kawaguchi got some strikes in on the Pole in the second round, but Pudzian scored two takedowns, likely the convincing factor for the judges, who ruled in favor of Pudzianowski, who won by unanimous decision.

DREAM
Kawaguchi made his DREAM debut against James Thompson at DREAM.16 and won via a controversial split decision.

Professional wrestling
As a professional wrestler, Kawaguchi worked exclusively for the Inoki Genome Federation (IGF), where he performed under the ring name . He retired in 2016.

Championships and accomplishments
DEEP
DEEP Megaton Champion (1 Time, First)
Three Successful Title Defenses
2008 DEEP Megaton Grand Prix Tournament Winner

Kickboxing record

|-  
|-  bgcolor="#FFBBBB"
| 2014-09-07 || Loss ||align=left| Prince Ali || HEAT 33 || Nagoya, Japan || TKO || 3 || 0:47 || 0–1
|-  
! style=background:white colspan=9 |   
|- 
|-
| colspan=9 | Legend:

Mixed martial arts record

|-
| Loss
| align=center| 18–10
| Aori Gele
| TKO (punches)
|  Road FC 34
|  
| align=center| 1
| align=center| 2:38
| Shijiazhuang, China
|
|-
| Win
| align=center| 18–9
| Kozo Urita
| Decision (unanimous)
| Grachan / Blue Dog Gym – Grachan 25 / BFC Vol.2
|  
| align=center| 2
| align=center| 5:00
| Tokyo, Japan
|
|-
| Loss
| align=center| 17–9
| Richard Odoms
| KO (knee)
| WSOF-GC 2 – World Series of Fighting Global Championship: Japan 1
|  
| align=center| 1
| align=center| 3:29
| Tokyo, Japan
| 
|-
| Win
| align=center| 17–8
| Yoon Seob Kwak
| Submission (arm-triangle choke)
| Real Fight Championship 3
|  
| align=center| 1
| align=center| 3:18
| Yokohama, Japan
| 
|-
| Loss
| align=center| 16–8
| Mu Bae Choi
| TKO (punches)
| Road FC 24
|  
| align=center| 2
| align=center| 4:50
| Tokyo, Japan
| 
|-
| Win
| align=center| 16–7
| Fumio Yoshimura
| TKO (punches)
| BFC: Blue Dog Fighting Charity Match Vol.1
| 
| align=center| 1
| align=center| 1:17
| Tokyo, Japan
|
|-
| Loss
| align=center| 15–7
| Brett Rogers
| KO (punches)
| Inoki Genome Fight 1
| 
| align=center| 1
| align=center| 0:28
| Tokyo, Japan
|
|-
| Win
| align=center| 15–6
| Se Yun Kim
| TKO
| Gladiator 61 – Bushido
| 
| align=center| 1
| align=center| 0:20
| Tokyo, Japan
|
|-
| Win
| align=center| 14–6
| Justin Morton
| Decision (Unanimous)
| Tenkaichi Fight – Tenkaichi Fight 68
| 
| align=center| 2
| align=center| 5:00
| Okinawa, Japan
|
|-
| Loss
| align=center| 13–6
| Rolles Gracie Jr.
| Submission (arm-triangle choke)
| Inoki-Bom-Be-Ye 2012
| 
| align=center| 1
| align=center| 2:00
| Tokyo, Japan
|
|-
| Loss
| align=center| 13–5
| Jörgen Kruth
| TKO (punches and elbows)
| Rumble of the Kings 6
| 
| align=center| 1
| align=center| 3:18
| Stockholm, Sweden
|
|-
| Loss
| align=center| 13–4
| Soa Palelei
| TKO (punches)
| AFC Fight Nite 01
| 
| align=center| 1
| align=center| 4:20
| Melbourne, Australia
|
|-
| Loss
| align=center| 13–3
| Peter Graham
| TKO (elbows)
| Xtreme MMA 3
| 
| align=center| 1
| align=center| N/A
| Sydney, Australia
|
|-
| Win
| align=center| 13–2
| Edmund Cavalcante Jr.
| Decision (unanimous)
| Gladiator 11: G-1
| 
| align=center| 2
| align=center| 5:00
| Tokyo, Japan
|
|-
| Win
| align=center| 12–2
| James Thompson
| Decision (split)
| DREAM.16
| 
| align=center| 2
| align=center| 5:00
| Nagoya, Japan
|
|-
| Loss
| align=center| 11–2
| Mariusz Pudzianowski
| Decision (unanimous)
| KSW 13: Kumite
| 
| align=center| 2
| align=center| 5:00
| Katowice, Poland
|
|-
| Win
| align=center| 11–1
| Roque Martinez
| Decision (unanimous)
| Deep: Cage Impact 2009
| 
| align=center| 3
| align=center| 5:00
| Tokyo, Japan
| <small>Defended DEEP Megaton title.
|-
| Win
| align=center| 10–1
| Seigo Mizuguchi
| TKO (leg kicks)
| Deep: 44 Impact
| 
| align=center| 3
| align=center| 1:27
| Tokyo, Japan
| Defended DEEP Megaton title.
|-
| Win
| align=center| 9–1
| Cirio Tejera
| Decision (unanimous)
| M-1 Challenge 18: Netherlands Day Two
| 
| align=center| 2
| align=center| 5:00
| Hilversum, Netherlands
|
|-
| Loss
| align=center| 8–1
| Rob Broughton
| Decision (unanimous)
| M-1 Challenge 14: Japan
| 
| align=center| 2
| align=center| 5:00
| Tokyo, Japan
|
|-
| Win
| align=center| 8–0
| Baru Harn
| Decision (majority)
| Deep: 38 Impact
| 
| align=center| 2
| align=center| 5:00
| Tokyo, Japan
| <small>Defended DEEP Megaton title.
|-
| Win
| align=center| 7–0
| Shunsuke Inoue
| Decision (split)
| Deep: Megaton Grand Prix 2008 Finals
| 
| align=center| 2
| align=center| 4:00
| Tokyo, Japan
| <small>Grand Prix final bout. Won DEEP Megaton title.
|-
| Win
| align=center| 6–0
| Shunji Kosaka
| TKO (corner stoppage)
| Deep: Megaton Grand Prix 2008 Finals
| 
| align=center| 1
| align=center| 0:45
| Tokyo, Japan
| <small>Grand Prix semi-final bout.
|-
| Win
| align=center| 5–0
| Wakashoyo
| TKO (punches)
| Deep: Megaton Grand Prix 2008 Semifinal
| 
| align=center| 1
| align=center| 0:16
| Tokyo, Japan
| <small>Grand Prix quarter-final bout.
|-
| Win
| align=center| 4–0
| Nobuyoshi Takahara
| TKO (punches)
| Deep: Megaton Grand Prix 2008 Opening Round
| 
| align=center| 1
| align=center| 0:40
| Tokyo, Japan
| <small>Grand Prix prelim round bout.
|-
| Win
| align=center| 3–0
| Seigo Mizuguchi
| TKO (punches)
| Deep: 32 Impact
| 
| align=center| 1
| align=center| 2:07
| Tokyo, Japan
|
|-
| Win
| align=center| 2–0
| Iro Zeki
| KO (punch)
| Deep: 31 Impact
| 
| align=center| 1
| align=center| 1:06
| Tokyo, Japan
|
|-
| Win
| align=center| 1–0
| Hirotaka Fujiyama
| Decision (majority)
| Deep: 29 Impact
| 
| align=center| 2
| align=center| 5:00
| Tokyo, Japan
|

See also
 List of male mixed martial artists

References

External links

1980 births
Living people
Japanese male mixed martial artists
Heavyweight mixed martial artists
Japanese male judoka
Mixed martial artists utilizing judo
Mixed martial artists utilizing kickboxing
Japanese male professional wrestlers
Sportspeople from Akita Prefecture
Deep (mixed martial arts) champions